Withers – earlier Wither, Wyther – is an English surname of Old English origin. It is today a family name found throughout the Anglosphere.

History
The name appears on various early documents in England, such as a charter of Æthelred II in 1005 where a witness signs as "Ego Ƿiþer minister" (I Wither, the assistant).  In the Domesday Book of 1086 it is the name of a tenant prior to that date. It seems to be a personal name, rather than a place name or occupational name, of unknown meaning: suggestions have included "wood",  "withstand", "warrior" or "willow".

While the name occurs in connection with landholdings in various counties of England before the 1150s, the first continuous record of a family seems to be in Lancashire and Cheshire where Sir Robert Wither, knight, of Pendleton and of Halton, was seneschal to Roger de Lacy, who died in 1211. He is recorded as marrying Joan, daughter of Sir Adam Bostock, knight, of Davenham.

By the 15th century, families claiming descent from Sir Robert Wither were living in Cheshire, Lancashire, Wiltshire, Essex, London, Somerset and Hampshire. The Withers in Hampshire, deriving from a member who migrated from Lancashire in the 14th century, were particularly prominent.  From 1484, they were lords of the manor of Manydown near Wootton St Lawrence, remaining linked to that estate for more than 400 years.

Coat of arms

One Withers was granted a coat of arms.  In the reign of Queen Mary I (1553–1558), Sir Richard Withers of East Sheen (ancestor of the poet George Wither) received a coat registered in the College of Arms, London. The blazon has "Argent, a chevron gules between three crescents sable" (i.e., White/silver field, red chevron between 3 black crescents). The traditional family motto is "I grow and wither both together".

Notable people named Withers, Wither, or Wyther

Actors
Bernadette Withers (1946–2019), American actress
Googie Withers (1917–2011), British movie actress
Grant Withers (1905–1959), American movie actor
Isabel Withers (1896–1968), American actress
Jane Withers (1926–2021), American radio, television and movie actress
Mark Withers (actor) (born 1947), American television actor

Ambassadors
John L. Withers, II, US Ambassador to Albania

Artists and architects 
Ernest Withers (1922–2007), African-American photographer
Frederick Clarke Withers (1828–1901), British-American Gothic Revival architect
Margery Withers (1894–1966), Australian artist (daughter of Walter Withers)
Robert Jewell Withers (1824–1894), English ecclesiastical architect, brother of Frederick
Walter Withers (1854–1914), Australian landscape artist

Athletes
Bob Withers, Australian Rules footballer during the 1950s–1960s
Charlie Withers (1922–2005), English footballer
Colin Withers (born 1940), English footballer
David D. Withers (1821–1892), American racehorse breeder
Gadwin Withers, British athlete in the 1908 Summer Olympics
H. W. Withers, American college basketball and football coach
Lincoln Withers (born 1981), Australian rugby league player 
Mark Withers (footballer) (born 1964), Australian Rules footballer 
Michael Withers (born 1976), Australian rugby league footballer
Ted Withers (1915–1994), English footballer who played for Southampton and Bristol Rovers

Military
 Henry Withers (c.1651–1729), British soldier and politician
Jones M. Withers (1814–1890), American Confederate major general; lawyer and politician  
Ramsey Muir Withers (born 1930), Canadian soldier, former Chief of the Defence Staff

Musicians
Bill Withers (1938–2020), African-American singer-songwriter
Elisabeth Withers, American jazz/R&B singer
Pick Withers (born 1948), British rock and jazz drummer

Politicians
Capt. John Withers (1634-1699), burgess and justice in colonial Virginia
Charles Bigg Wither (1822–1894), member of the New Zealand Legislative Council
Sir John Withers (1863–1939), British politician
Garrett L. Withers (1884–1953), American politician 
George Withers (1843-1908), Australian politician
Reginald Withers (1924–2014), Australian politician
Robert E. Withers (1821–1907), physician, US Senator and diplomat
Thomas Jefferson Withers (1804–1865), Confederate politician during the American Civil War
William Withers (1657–1720), English politician, Lord Mayor of London 1707–1708
William A. Withers (died 1887), mayor of Cumberland, Maryland, USA

Writers
Alexander Scott Withers (1792–1865), American historian of early Appalachian Indian-white warfare
Charles W. J. Withers (born 1954), Scottish historical geographer
George Wither (1588–1667), English poet and satirist

Fictional characters
Hildegarde Withers, in novels by Stuart Palmer

References

Citations

Other sources
Withers Family of the County Lancaster, England, and of Stafford County, Virginia Establishing the Ancestry of Robert Edwin Withers, III; Presented by Mr. Robert Edwin Withers, Sr. of Pittsburgh, Pennsylvania (1947). 
Virginia Historical Magazine review (1948).
Berry, William (1833), County Genealogies: Degrees of the Families of the County of Hants: Collected From the Heraldic Visitations and Other Authentic Manuscript Museum, and in the Possession of Private Individuals; London: Sherwood, Gilbert and Piper, 379 pgs. [NB: Hants = Hampshire]
Bigg-Wither, Reginald Fitz Hugh, Materials for a History of the Wither Family, Winchester: Warren & Son, 1907.
Gatewood, Virginia Pierce and Robert L., A Withers-Downey Genealogy: A Withers History With Allied Lines, Conway, AR: 1966.
Recum, Franz V., Withers -- America or A Collection of Genealogical Data Concerning the History of the Descendants in the Male Line of James Withers (1680/1-1746) of Stafford County, Virginia, New York: 1949.
"The Withers Family, of Stafford, Fauquier, &c.," The Virginia Magazine of History and Biography, Vol. 6, No. 3 (Jan. 1899):309-313; Vol. 6, No. 4 (Apr. 1899):425-427. Digital version at JSTOR.
Withers, Webster, "An Unfinished History of the Withers Family in Kansas City, Missouri". Kansas City, Mo.: Webb Print, 1932.

See also
Withers (disambiguation)
Oakley Hall, Hampshire

Surnames of Old English origin